The Big Giant Head is a fictional character from the American sitcom 3rd Rock from the Sun; he is the Solomons' mission leader and king of the universe.

Role on the show
He was an unseen character at first, and even then very rarely referred to. When Harry expressed that he was upset about not serving any useful purpose in the mission, the family revealed to him that he was modified to serve as the transmitter that relayed messages from the Big Giant Head, from which point the character then "spoke" through Harry. He apparently got his job by "outrunning the fireball". Though the Solomons are subordinate to the Big Giant Head, they sometimes express dissatisfaction with his leadership, with Dick declaring at one point that he only got the job because he "kissed the Big Giant Butt."

When the character did eventually appear on screen, he was portrayed (in human form) by William Shatner, and did very little apart from wreak havoc on the Solomons' lives. He insisted on being waited on hand and foot, and frequently interrupted Dick's physics classes, posing as an associate of the Solomons under the pseudonym "Stone Phillips" (Mrs. Dubcek asked him if it was "Like the guy from Dateline", to which "Stone" answered, "No").

He eventually confessed to being Dick's father, at which point, Harry stated that if Dick was going to take over The Big Giant Head, his name would be Dick Head.

Relationship with Vicki
After landing on the Earth, Stone (the Big Giant Head) knew very little about women. He was very rude towards them, he decided to go along with Tommy to his Junior Prom, where he met Vicki Dubcek, who was trying to hook up, since she never had her junior prom. Vicki was also trying to get pregnant with Harry's child but they just had a break-up. After "Stone" beamed her up to his "bachelor pod" for the night, Vicki declared the next day that she was pregnant by him. Stone left immediately, and about 2 hours later Vicki delivered his baby, whom she named Eric Travis ("E.T."). After Stone left, Vicki called a news reporter, saying that she was the  mother of a new species. The reporter showed up, but didn't believe her story, because the baby looked like a normal human being. Stone later returned, after he decided that he wanted to take his son back to his home planet but Vicki refused. Stone decided that they had to make up with Vicki in order to become a family. Unfortunately Harry still had feelings for Vicki, and was also trying to win her back. However, at the ending of the episode Harry decided that, since she had a baby with Stone, she was better off becoming a family with Stone. Stone told Vicki that he and the Solomons were aliens and the two left to explore the galaxy. They returned to Earth together one last time, at which point it was revealed that Vicki still had feelings for Harry, and thought she made the wrong choice when she left Earth with Stone, because she found their marriage boring.

Miscellaneous
The Solomons first meet the Big Giant Head in person when he arrived by plane at their local airport, in an obviously agitated state.  When asked about his flight, he responded "Horrifying, at first. I looked out the window and ... I saw something on the wing of the plane", to which Dick responded "The same thing happened to me!" This is a double reference. In an early episode, Dick attempts to fly for the first time and is frightened when he sees something on the wing of the plane. Both references are also to the Twilight Zone story "Nightmare at 20,000 Feet", which tells of a man on a commercial flight who is convinced he sees a creature on the plane's wing which no one else can see.  Both William Shatner and John Lithgow (Dick) had previously played that Twilight Zone character; Shatner played it in the original 1963 TV series episode, and Lithgow played it in the 1983 movie remake.

References

3rd Rock from the Sun characters
Extraterrestrial characters in television
Fictional kings
Television characters introduced in 2000